Cambridge Township is one of the nineteen townships of Guernsey County, Ohio, United States.  As of the 2010 census the population was 14,570, of whom 3,935 lived in the unincorporated portion of the township.

Geography
Located in the western part of the county, it borders the following townships:
Liberty Township - north
Jefferson Township - northeast
Center Township - east
Jackson Township - south
Westland Township - southwest
Adams Township - west
Knox Township - northwest

The city of Cambridge, the county seat of Guernsey County, is located in central Cambridge Township.

Name and history
Cambridge Township was established in 1810. It is the only Cambridge Township statewide.

Government
The township is governed by a three-member board of trustees, who are elected in November of odd-numbered years to a four-year term beginning on the following January 1. Two are elected in the year after the presidential election and one is elected in the year before it. There is also an elected township fiscal officer, who serves a four-year term beginning on April 1 of the year after the election, which is held in November of the year before the presidential election. Vacancies in the fiscal officership or on the board of trustees are filled by the remaining trustees.

References

External links
County website

Townships in Guernsey County, Ohio
Townships in Ohio